Wandella is a genus of Australian crevice weavers that was first described by Michael R. Gray in 1994.

Species
 it contains 14 species:
Wandella alinjarra Gray, 1994 – Australia (Northern Territory)
Wandella australiensis (L. Koch, 1873) – Australia (Queensland)
Wandella barbarella Gray, 1994 (type) – Australia (Western Australia)
Wandella centralis Gray, 1994 – Australia (Western Australia, Northern Territory, South Australia)
Wandella diamentina Gray, 1994 – Australia (Queensland, South Australia)
Wandella grayi Magalhaes, 2016 – Australia (Queensland)
Wandella infernalis Magalhaes, 2016 – Australia (Western Australia)
Wandella loloata (Magalhaes, Berry, Koh & Gray, 2022) – Papua New Guinea
Wandella murrayensis Gray, 1994 – Australia (South Australia, New South Wales, Victoria, Western Australia)
Wandella orana Gray, 1994 – Australia (New South Wales, Queensland)
Wandella pallida Gray, 1994 – Australia (Western Australia)
Wandella parnabyi Gray, 1994 – Australia (Western Australia, Northern Territory)
Wandella stuartensis Gray, 1994 – Australia (Western Australia, South Australia, New South Wales, Queensland)
Wandella waldockae Gray, 1994 – Australia (Western Australia)

References

Araneomorphae genera
Filistatidae
Spiders of Australia